Reil is a surname. Notable people with the surname include:

Billy Reil (born 1979), American professional wrestler
Johann Christian Reil (1759–1813), German physician, anatomist, and psychiatrist
John Reil (born 1949), Canadian politician
Jürgen Reil (born 1966), German musician
German-language surnames
Surnames of German origin